Uzunalan can refer to:

 Uzunalan, Ayvacık
 Uzunalan, Çan